Honolulu Weekly was an alternative weekly newspaper published in Honolulu, Hawaii. Founded by Laurie V. Carlson, it began publishing in the summer of 1991, ostensibly to fill gaps in investigative reporting left by the two main dailies, Honolulu Star-Bulletin and The Honolulu Advertiser, which were under a joint operating agreement at the time, but creating new gaps in taste and perspective. In May 2005 the Weekly acquired the Kona-based Hawaii Island Journal. The Hawaii Island Journal published its last issue on Friday, June 13, 2008. The Honolulu Weekly published its final issue on June 5, 2013, and ceased operations. Publisher Carlson cited low ad revenues and the failure to find a buyer as among the primary reasons for shutting the paper down.

References

External links

Page from the Association of Alternative Newsweeklies

Defunct newspapers published in Hawaii
Alternative weekly newspapers published in the United States
Publications established in 1991
Publications disestablished in 2013
1991 establishments in Hawaii
2013 disestablishments in Hawaii